The Pak, or Pak salto, is a release move performed on the uneven bars in women's artistic gymnastics.  The move starts with the gymnast hanging on the high bar and facing the low bar, then swinging forwards towards the low bar and performing a straight backward salto to catch the low bar.

The uneven bar transition is named for former gymnast Gyong Sil Pak of North Korea.

Variations 
The Pak salto can also be performed with a full twist (called a Bhardwaj salto), after American gymnast Mohini Bhardwaj), which increases its difficulty level.

External links 
Code of Points at the official website of the International Federation of Gymnastics (FIG)
YouTube The innovator, Gyong Sil Pak of North Korea performing her skill, the Pak salto - 1991 World Gymnastics Championships. 

Artistic gymnastics
Sports rules and regulations